Tuomas Ville Juhana Enbuske (born 22 September 1977) is a Finnish radio and TV presenter and journalist.

Enbuske hosted Kiss FM's morning program with Henkka Hyppönen, and was a presenter in the television series Far Out, Hyppönen Enbuske Experience, and Tuomas & Juuso Experience. Since 2007, Enbuske has hosted the debate program/talk show, Tuomas Enbuske on Yle Radio 1.

In September 2008, Yle TV1 started airing Epäkorrektia, Tuomas Enbuske! ((politically) Incorrect, Tuomas Enbuske!) where Enbuske challenged "established truths", essentially putting forward arguments in favor of them. The shows consisted of personal interviews, primarily of YLE archival video material, where the soundtrack is mostly a monologue.

From 2016 to 2018 Enbuske hosted a talkshow called Enbuske, Veitola & Salminen along with Maria Veitola and Roope Salminen.

Tuomas Enbuske was born in Oulu. He has two children with Hannah Norrena. Enbuske and Norrena divorced in 2013.

Political views
Enbuske has defined himself as a classical liberal, supporting free market economy and Western civilization.

External links
 Tuomas Enbuske at Yle Radio 1

1977 births
Living people
People from Oulu
Movement Now politicians
Finnish television presenters
Finnish journalists